In enzymology, a diphosphoinositol-pentakisphosphate kinase is an enzyme that catalyzes the chemical reaction

ATP + 1D-myo-inositol 5-diphosphate pentakisphosphate  ADP + 1D-myo-inositol bisdiphosphate tetrakisphosphate (isomeric configuration unknown)

Thus, the two substrates of this enzyme are ATP and 1D-myo-inositol 5-diphosphate pentakisphosphate, whereas its 3 products are ADP, 1D-myo-inositol bisdiphosphate tetrakisphosphate and (isomeric configuration unknown).

This enzyme belongs to the family of transferases, specifically those transferring phosphorus-containing groups (phosphotransferases) with a phosphate group as acceptor.  The systematic name of this enzyme class is ATP:1D-myo-inositol-5-diphosphate-pentakisphosphate phosphotransferase. Other names in common use include PP-IP5 kinase, diphosphoinositol pentakisphosphate kinase, and ATP:5-diphospho-1D-myo-inositol-pentakisphosphate phosphotransferase.

References

 
 

EC 2.7.4
Enzymes of unknown structure